The West Bay Club is located on Sand Island of the Apostle Islands National Lakeshore.

History
The clubhouse was built for sufferers of allergic rhinitis from Saint Paul, Minnesota and was designed by Buechner & Orth. It was added to the Wisconsin State Register of Historic Places in 2014 and to the National Register of Historic Places the following year.

References

Clubhouses on the National Register of Historic Places in Wisconsin
Log buildings and structures on the National Register of Historic Places in Wisconsin
National Register of Historic Places in Bayfield County, Wisconsin
National Register of Historic Places in Apostle Islands National Lakeshore
Rustic architecture in Wisconsin
Buildings and structures completed in 1913